Sadabad (also Romanized as Sa‘dābād and Sa‘adābād; also known as Sa‘dābād Maḩalleh and Sa‘īdābād) is a village in Howmeh Rural District, in the Central District of Shahrud County, Semnan Province, Iran. At the 2006 census, its population was 307, in 96 families.

References 

Populated places in Shahrud County